Kumrek is an urban village lying on the bank of River Rangpo in Pakyong District in the Indian state of Sikkim. The nearest towns are Rangpo ( away) and Rorathang.

Transport
Kumrek lies on the road connecting Rangpo to Rorathang.
Nearest airport from Kumrek is Pakyong Airport 32 kilometres away and nearest railway station from Kumrek is Rangpo railway station 5 kilometres away.

Economy
The entire belt of Kumrek – Rorathang and Kumrek – Rangpo is the manufacturing hotspot of sikkim. There are numerous pharmaceutical companies along this way.

List of some of Major companies of Kumrek are as follows:
Alkem Laboratories.	
Cipla Ltd.
Indchemie Health Specialities Pvt. Ltd.
Zuventus Healthcare.
Zydus Healthcare.
Scorpion Containers Pvt. Ltd.
Malu Electrodes Private Limited
Seigneur Medipack Unit Sikkim.
Lupin Ltd.
Madhya Bharat Power Corporation Etc

Attractions
 Gulmohar Picnic Spot Kumrek
Rangpo River
 Raniban Picnic Ground, just opposite to Gulmohar Picnic Spot.

References

Cities and towns in Pakyong district
Villages in Pakyong district
Pakyong district